Hypatopa acus is a moth in the family Blastobasidae. It is found in Costa Rica.

The length of the forewings is 4.4–4.7 mm. The forewings are pale brown intermixed with brownish-orange scales and a few brown scales. The hindwings are translucent brown, gradually darkening towards the apex.

Etymology
The specific name is derived from Latin acus (meaning a needle).

References

Moths described in 2013
Hypatopa